Best Footballer in Asia is an annual association football award organized and presented by Titan Sports. It is awarded to the player who had the best performance for Asian football during the previous calendar year.

History 
Inspired by Ballon d'Or and France Football, the editorial team of Titan Sports decided to launch an award in honor of the player deemed to have performed the best in Asian football over the previous year. This award was founded in 2013. The winner is voted by a panel of football journalists, the majority of whom are from nations/regions corresponding to national associations of Asian Football Confederation, while the others are from media outlets of non-AFC nations/regions.

Eligibility 
The prize is open to all footballers who participate Asian football, by playing for national teams or clubs affiliated to Asian Football Confederation during the targeted calendar year.

In detail, three categories of players are eligible to be nominated as candidates of the prize.

a) Footballers who have nationality/citizenship of nations/regions corresponding to national associations affiliated to AFC, and play for football clubs affiliated to AFC. (e.g. Omar Abdulrahman, the UAE footballer playing for Al Ain won the second place in Best Footballer in Asia 2016)

b) Footballers who play for non-AFC clubs, and are eligible to play FIFA 'A' matches during the targeted year representing national teams (either senior level or any junior level) of national associations affiliated to AFC.  (e.g. Son Heung-min, who played in European leagues and Korea Republic national football team, is the record Best Footballer in Asia winner).

c) Footballers who are not citizens of nations/regions corresponding to national associations affiliated to AFC, and play for  football clubs of national associations affiliated to AFC. (e.g. Elkeson, the Brazilian striker who played for Guangzhou Evergrande won the second place of the inaugural Best Footballer in Asia)

Voting 
The juror team is constituted by a panel of journalists, invited from AFC nations/regions and non-AFC media outlets. Each juror contributes one vote.

Rules 
Each juror selects 5 best footballers and awards them 6, 4, 3, 2 points and 1 point respectively from their first choice to the fifth choice (Before 2017, the first-choice was awarded 5 points rather than 6). The trophy of the Best Footballer in Asia is awarded to the player with the highest total of points. Since 2017, the first-choice player in each vote will be awarded 6 points while the other 4 choices will still be awarded 4, 3, 2 points and 1 point respectively according to their ranking in each vote.

Tiebreakers
When two or more candidates obtain the same points, the rankings of the concerned candidates would be based upon the following criteria in order. 

a) The number of the 1st-place vote obtained

b) The number of the 2nd-place vote obtained

c) The number of the 3rd-place vote obtained

d) The number of the 4th-place vote obtained

If all conditions are equal, the concerned candidates will be tied in rankings. 

If the concerned candidates are tied in the first-place, the concerned candidates will share the award and the trophy.

Winners

Statistics

Multiple winners

Wins by country

See also
Asian Footballer of the Year

Notes

References 

Awards established in 2013
ATitan
2013 establishments in Asia